The Sri Lanka cricket team toured  the United Arab Emirates in September and October 2017 to play two Tests, five One Day Internationals (ODIs) and three Twenty20 International (T20I) matches against the Pakistan cricket team. It included the first Tests that Sarfaraz Ahmed of Pakistan  captained following the retirement of Misbah-ul-Haq. The tour also featured a T20I match in Pakistan, the first time that Sri Lanka had visited the country since 2009.

On 27 September 2017, the Pakistan Cricket Board (PCB) named umpires for the Test and ODI fixtures. The second Test match was played as a day/night fixture, the first day/night Test for Sri Lanka. Sri Lanka won the Test series 2–0. It was Pakistan's first whitewash in the United Arab Emirates, and only their second whitewash in a home series, after losing 3–0 to Australia in October 2002. Pakistan won the ODI series 5–0. Sri Lanka became the first side to be whitewashed 5–0 three times in ODIs in the same calendar year, after previously losing to South Africa in January and India in August.

Return to Pakistan
In August 2017, Thilanga Sumathipala, president of Sri Lanka Cricket, said that he would like to play at least one of the three T20I matches in Lahore, Pakistan during October. In March 2009, the Sri Lanka cricket team were attacked by terrorists while travelling to the Gaddafi Stadium in Lahore. Since then, the only Test side to visit Pakistan has been Zimbabwe, when they toured during May 2015. Two of Sri Lanka's current team, Chamara Kapugedera and Suranga Lakmal were on the bus during the 2009 terrorist attack, and both could have been selected for the T20I squad for this series.

In September 2017, the fixtures were confirmed, with the final T20I match of the series scheduled to be played in Lahore. Sri Lanka Cricket said that players have a "contractual obligation" to play the match in Lahore, but it was unlikely to issue penalties to any player who chose not to visit Pakistan. However, on 14 October 2017, the Sri Lankan team expressed their reluctance to travel to Pakistan, requesting that the fixture is moved to a neutral venue. On 16 October 2017, Sri Lanka Cricket confirmed that the fixture in Lahore would go ahead as planned, but their limited-overs captain, Upul Tharanga, had pulled out of the match. Despite the concerns from the players, team manager Asanka Gurusinha felt that a competitive squad would be named. On 19 October 2017, Sri Lanka's chief selector, Graham Labrooy, said that players who do not travel to Lahore would be unlikely to be selected for the other two T20I fixtures. The squad for the T20I fixtures was named two days later, with Thisara Perera selected as captain.

The Sri Lankan squad arrived in Lahore under "extraordinary" security and made their way to the team's hotel in a bomb-proof bus. Ahead of the T20I in Lahore, Cricket Sri Lanka's president Thilanga Sumathipala said that the team was privileged to be in Pakistan and that he would help support the country in hosting more tours. Najam Sethi, chairman of the PCB, said that this fixture would be the start of international cricket returning to the country, with him expecting every country to play in Pakistan by the end of 2020. Pakistan went on to win the T20I series 3–0. Following the conclusion of the match, the Asian Cricket Council announced that the 2018 ACC Emerging Teams Asia Cup would be played in Pakistan in April. However, the tournament was moved to December 2018, with Pakistan and Sri Lanka co-hosting the event.

Squads

Ahead of the ODI series, Mohammad Amir was ruled out of Pakistan's squad with an injury, with Usman Shinwari added as his replacement. Nuwan Pradeep was ruled out of Sri Lanka's ODI squad with an injury, with Lahiru Gamage added as his replacement. Ahead of the third ODI, Sadeera Samarawickrama was added to Sri Lanka's ODI squad.

Test series

1st Test

2nd Test

ODI series

1st ODI

2nd ODI

3rd ODI

4th ODI

5th ODI

T20I series

1st T20I

2nd T20I

3rd T20I

References

External links
 Series home at ESPN Cricinfo

2017 in Pakistani cricket
2017 in Sri Lankan cricket
International cricket competitions in 2017–18
International cricket tours of the United Arab Emirates